Majestic Football Club, also known as Majestic or Majestic FC, is a Burkinabé football club based in Ouagadougou which plays in the Burkinabé Premier League.

Stadium
Currently the team plays at the 25,000 capacity Stade Municipal.

References

External links
Soccerway
Futbol24
Football clubs in Burkina Faso